The Nuremberg executions took place on 16 October 1946, shortly after the conclusion of the Nuremberg trials. Ten prominent members of the political and military leadership of Nazi Germany were executed by hanging:  Hans Frank, Wilhelm Frick, Alfred Jodl, Ernst Kaltenbrunner, Wilhelm Keitel, Joachim von Ribbentrop, Alfred Rosenberg, Fritz Sauckel, Arthur Seyss-Inquart, and Julius Streicher. Hermann Göring was also scheduled to be hanged on that day, but committed suicide using a potassium cyanide capsule the night before. Martin Bormann was also sentenced to death in absentia; at the time his whereabouts were unknown, but it is now thought that he committed suicide or was killed by Soviet troops while attempting to escape Berlin on 2 May 1945.

The sentences were carried out in the gymnasium of Nuremberg Prison by the United States Army using the standard drop method instead of long drop.

The executioners were Master Sergeant John C. Woods and his assistant, military policeman Joseph Malta. Woods miscalculated the lengths for the ropes used for the executions, some alleging intentionally, such that some of the men did not die quickly of an intended broken neck but instead strangled to death slowly.

Some reports indicated some executions took from 14 to 28 minutes.  The Army denied claims that the drop length was too short or that the condemned died from strangulation instead of a broken neck. Additionally, the trapdoor was too small, such that several of the condemned suffered bleeding head injuries when they hit the sides of the trapdoor while dropping through.

The bodies were rumored to have been taken to Dachau for cremation, but were in fact incinerated in a crematorium in Munich and the ashes scattered over the river Isar.

Kingsbury Smith of the International News Service wrote an eyewitness account of the hangings. His account appeared with photos in newspapers.

Order of executions

The executions started at 1:11a.m. with von Ribbentrop. The total span was just about two hours.

Notes

References 

October 1946 events in Europe
 
Articles containing video clips
1946 in Germany